Francis James "Ken" Le Breton (15 August 1924 Sydney, New South Wales – 6 January 1951) was an Australian Motorcycle speedway rider who was nicknamed "The White Ghost" due to his wearing white leathers.

Early career
Le Breton served in the Australian Army as a gunner in World War II. His service in New Guinea ended when he was hospitalized with swamp fever (malaria) and battle fatigue. He was discharged in 1945 and took up speedway the following year. He took part in novice trials at the Sydney Sports Ground but failed to impress and was turned away. He then took part in trials at the West Maitland Showground in New South Wales and was immediately noticed by everybody as he appeared with all white leathers and bike. Ray Duggan was at the meeting took an interest in Le Breton and helped him get established back at the Sydney Sports Ground where he rode in all white as "The White Ghost."

UK career
He sailed to the UK in 1947 to try to get a team place and signed for the New Cross Rangers, but things did not go so well so the second division Newcastle Diamonds signed him in exchange for Jeff Lloyd and £1000. He moved with the Newcastle promotion to Glasgow with the Ashfield Giants in 1949 and completed two seasons there until 1950.

World Final Appearance
 1949 -  London, Wembley Stadium - 13th - 4pts

Death
Ken was involved in a crash on 5 January 1951 at the Sydney Sports Ground where he first rode a speedway bike. He was representing Australia in the 2nd Test match of the 1950–51 season against England. In heat eighteen, he was attempting to pass England's Eddie Rigg on the last bend, looking to gain third place when he cut into Rigg's rear wheel. Ken's bike locked and he hit the safety fence hard and straight on. He died the next day in St Vincent's Hospital in Sydney due to severe head injuries including a fractured skull. He had also punctured his lung.

References

1924 births
1951 deaths
Australian speedway riders
Motorcycle racers who died while racing
Newcastle Diamonds riders
New Cross Rangers riders
Sport deaths in Australia
Accidental deaths in New South Wales
Motorcycle racers from Sydney
Australian Army personnel of World War II
Australian Army soldiers